Muhammad Amin bin Zakaria is a Malaysian politician and served as Perak State Executive Councillor.

Election Results

Honours 
  :
  Knight of the Order of Cura Si Manja Kini (DPCM) - Dato' (2014)

References

United Malays National Organisation politicians
Members of the Perak State Legislative Assembly
Perak state executive councillors
21st-century Malaysian politicians
Living people
Year of birth missing (living people)
People from Perak
Malaysian people of Malay descent
Malaysian Muslims